Coscinedes is a genus of beetles in the family Cerambycidae, containing the following species:

 Coscinedes gracilis Bates, 1885
 Coscinedes oaxacae Martins & Galileo, 2006

References

Callidiopini